Friedrich Heinrich Himmel (November 20, 1765 – June 8, 1814) was a German composer.

Biography
Himmel was born at Treuenbrietzen in Brandenburg, Prussia, and originally studied theology at Halle before turning to music.

During a temporary stay at Potsdam he had an opportunity of showing his self-acquired skill as a pianist before King Frederick William II, who thereupon provided him with a yearly allowance to enable him to complete his musical studies. This he did under Johann Gottlieb Naumann, a German composer of the Italian school, and the style of that school Himmel himself adopted in his operas.

The first of these, a pastoral opera, Il primo navigatore, was produced at Venice in 1794 with great success. In 1792, he went to Berlin, where his oratorio Isaaco was produced, in consequence of which he was made court Kapellmeister to the king of Prussia. In that capacity he wrote a great deal of official music, including cantatas and a coronation Te Deum.

His Italian operas, successively composed for Stockholm, St Petersburg and Berlin, were all received with great favour in their day. Of greater importance than these is a Singspiel to words by Kotzebue, called Fanchon. Himmel's gift of writing genuine simple melodies is also observable in his Lieder, including An Alexis send ich dich (To Alexis). He died in Berlin.

Works

Operas
 Il primo navigatore, pastorale Venice (1794)
 La morte di Semiramide, opera seria Naples (1795)
 Fanchon oder das Leyermädel, Singspiel Berlin (1804)
 Die Sylphen Zauberoper, Berlin (1806)
 Der Kobold, komische Oper, Vienna (1813)
 Alessandro (1799)
 Vasco di Gama (1801)
 Frohsinn und Schwarmerei (1801)

Lieder
 An Alexis send ich dich
 Vater unser
 Gebet während der Schlacht: "Vater ich rufe dich!"
 Die Blumen und der Schmetterling, Lieder cycle

Church music and cantatas
 Two masses
 Te Deum, for four voices and orchestra
 Salve Regina, for four voices and instruments
 Beatus vir, for four voices and instruments
 In exitu Israel
 Dixit Dominus
 Das Vertrauen auf Gott, cantata
 Das Lob Gottes ("Singet dem Herrn")
 Lobe den Herren, for choir and orchestra
 Psalmen Davids, for two voices and orchestra
 Three cantatas for choir and orchestra:
 Was betrubst du dich
 Heilig ist mein Beherrscher
 Wann Gott auch aufs Tiefste
 Trauer-Cantate zur Begräbnissfeyer Friedrich Wilhelm II von Preussen, for four voices and orchestra
 The 146th Psalm
 Vater unser, von Mahlmann
 other pieces of church music in manuscript

Bibliography
 Gerhard Allrogen: "Himmel, Friedrich Heinrich", in The New Grove Dictionary of Opera, ed. Stanley Sadie (London, 1992),

References

External links

 Musical Manuscripts Collection at the Harry Ransom Center
  
 

1765 births
1814 deaths
18th-century classical composers
19th-century classical composers
German male classical composers
German opera composers
Male opera composers
People from the Margraviate of Brandenburg
People from Treuenbrietzen
19th-century German male musicians